The 2017 UCI Junior Track Cycling World Championships was the annual Junior World Championship for track cycling held at the Velodromo Fassa Bortolo in Montichiari, Italy from 23 to 27 August 2017.

Medals were won across 20 disciplines.

Medal summary

Notes 
 Competitors named in italics contested the qualifying/first rounds only.
 In the first round, the same Russian quartet clocked a 4:00.972 WJR.
 In the first round, the same Russian trio clocked a 44.209 WJR.
 In the qualifying round (a flying 200m time trial), Mathilde Gros clocked a 10.709 WJR.
 In the qualifying round, Ellesse Andrews clocked a 2:18.080 WJR.

Medal table

References

External links

Organising Committee website
Results website
Results Book

UCI Juniors Track World Championships
UCI Juniors Track World Championships, 2017
Track cycling
International cycle races hosted by Italy